Narcís Duran (in Catalan), commonly known as Narciso Durán, OFM (December 16, 1776 in Empúries, Catalonia, Spain – June 4, 1846 in Santa Barbara, Alta California, Mexico) was a Franciscan friar and missionary. He arrived in California in 1806 after studying briefly at the missionary College of San Fernando de Mexico. He served at Mission San José until 1833, when he moved to Mission Santa Barbara. A the Mission San José he arrested Jedediah Smith shortly and then released him and have him go to Governor José María de Echeandía in Monterey, California.

Under his leadership, Mission San Jose became one of the most prosperous of the Spanish missions in California, notwithstanding the devastation for the Chocheño-speaking Natives, and Northern Valley Yokuts who resided at San Jose. His interests included music, which he transcribed himself and assembled a famous band of neophytes dressed in uniforms obtained from a French vessel.

Father Duran served as the Father-President of the California missions three times, first from 1824–1828, again from 1831–1838 and finally from 1844–1846. During his second term, the Mexican government decided to secularize the missions, and Father Durán moved to Santa Barbara, which was the only mission not to be secularized.

Father Durán died in Santa Barbara during his third term as Father-President, and is buried at Mission Santa Barbara.

References

1776 births
1846 deaths
People of Alta California
Roman Catholic missionaries in Mexico
Spanish Friars Minor
Priests of the Spanish missions in California
Spanish Roman Catholic missionaries
Franciscan missionaries
Spanish expatriates in Mexico